The name Ngbaka is used for several Ubangian peoples and their languages, such as
Ngbaka can be :
 Ngbaka Gbaya language
 M'Baka people and Mbaka language
 Ngbaka languages